In Ireland, Counties are divided into civil parishes which are sub-divided into townlands. The following is a list of civil parishes in County Down, Northern Ireland:

A
Aghaderg, Annaclone, Annahilt, Ardglass, Ardkeen, Ardquin

B
Ballee, Ballyculter, Ballykinler, Ballyphilip, Ballytrustan, Ballywalter, Bangor, Blaris, Bright

C
Castleboy, Clonallan, Clonduff, Comber

D
Donaghadee, Donaghcloney, Donaghmore, Down, Dromara, Dromore, Drumballyroney, Drumbeg, Drumbo, Drumgath, Drumgooland, Dundonald, Dunsfort

G
Garvaghy, Greyabbey

H
Hillsborough, Holywood

I
Inch, Inishargy

K
Kilbroney, Kilclief, Kilcoo, Kilkeel, Killaney, Killinchy, Killyleagh, Kilmegan, Kilmood, Kilmore, Knockbreda

L
Lambeg, Loughinisland

M
Maghera, Magheradrool, Magheralin, Magherally, Moira

N
Newry, Newtownards

R
Rathmullan

S
St. Andrews (alias Ballyhalbert), Saintfield, Saul, Seapatrick, Shankill, Slanes

T
Tullylish, Tullynakill, Tyrella

W
Warrenpoint, Witter

See also
List of townlands in County Down

References

 
Down
Civil parishes